Belvianes-et-Cavirac is a commune in the Aude department in southern France. The journalist and writer Gaston Bonheur (1913–1980) was born in Belvianes.

Population

See also
Communes of the Aude department

References

Communes of Aude
Aude communes articles needing translation from French Wikipedia